Speleoithona is a genus of copepods in the family Speleoithonidae, containing the following species:
Speleoithona bermudensis C. E. F. Rocha & Iliffe, 1993
Speleoithona eleutherensis C. E. F. Rocha & Iliffe, 1991
Speleoithona salvadorensis C. E. F. Rocha & Iliffe, 1991

References

External links

Cyclopoida genera
Taxonomy articles created by Polbot